Roman Szturc (born 25 September 1989) is a Czech professional ice hockey player who is currently a free agent. He played with HC Vítkovice Ridera in the Czech Extraliga from 2007 until 2019.

References

External links

1989 births
Living people
Czech ice hockey forwards
HC Dukla Jihlava players
HC Havířov players
Sportspeople from Karviná
HC Olomouc players
HC Slezan Opava players
HC Vítkovice players